is the protagonist of the original video animation Code Geass: Akito the Exiled produced by Sunrise. Akito is a 17-year-old soldier who has lost his hometown. He is an officer in E.U. military with the rank of lieutenant from a unit consisting of teenagers from Area 11 called W-0 under the command of Leila Malcal. During the year 2017 a.t.b., Akito takes part in a military operation on the European battlefront as a Knightmare Frame pilot. Akito is cursed with a supernatural "Geass" after command by his brother Shin Hyuga Shaing that he controls at will, allowing him to savagely kill his enemies in the battlefield, thus was given the title . Akito can also see spirits of his fallen comrades as he revealed as part of his post-traumatic disorder, and across the narrative he tries to overcome his grief. 

Akito was created by director Kazuki Akane who aimed to portray him as being too stoic in the series' beginning in order to make his relationship with Leila make a major impact in his growth. The character is voiced by Miyu Irino in Japanese and Micah Solusod in English. His younger persona is voiced by Ryōka Yuzuki in Japanese and Apphia Yu in English.

Despite early negative comments from the media that Akito was too brooding, journalists praised Akito's character arc in the series not only due to how he faces his past but also stands out in the franchise in general for avoiding the common dark narratives from the television series, Code Geass: Lelouch of the Rebellion.

Creation

Akito Hyuga was created by director Kazuki Akane who often aimed to initially display Akito as a fighter seemingly possessed but that in following episodes of the OVA he would become more expressive. The staff found it difficult to properly display Akito's expressions in the first episodes. His design was made by manga group Clamp. Akito's braids were initially unpopular within the Sunrise female staff. In the making of the series, Sunrise expressed the need to show how different is Akito from Leila; Akito is skilled at operating the machine. On the other hand, Leila Malkal is not familiar with the operation so they made her stagger when landing on the ground to emphasize that. They gave distinguishable characters to each machine to give the impression that it is the characters who are actually operating the machines.

Starting the third episode of the OVA, the staff made sure that through the exchanges between Akito and Leila, the former's characterization is shown further depths, most notably his misrelationship with his brother Shin which helped to foreshadow future events of the narrative. The staff was pleased with their handing Akito, his relationships and dreams. This was further shown by making Akito make a honest smile for the first time in the series. Miyu Irino enjoyed interacting with Maaya Sakamoto as she was the one voicing Leila. For the following episode, designer Kimura said that his favorite scene was when Akito is brainwashed by Shin to kill Leila but manages to ignore such order. The scene of Akito's Knightmare holding her like a princess was noted to stand out within the franchise due to how other princesses are often the subject of being victims in the television series and instead felt more fitting of Akane's preivous works. In the trailer for the final episode, there is a figure of Leila holding Akito's pigtails, and that picture was found meaningful by artist Takahiro Kimura. 

In the finale Irino said not were only highlights were the battle scenes alone, or new mechas but also the duel between Akito and Shin. He does think it is an exaggeration to say that it was drawn with overwhelming force, and it would not be an exaggeration to say that it was the culmination of everything the cast done so far. Regarding Akito's growth from the first chapter to the final chapter, he felt in the beginning, Akito acted like a robot carrying out a mission, with little emotion. In contrast, the Akito from the finale acts more like a human according to Irino. Akane added he drew it with the intention of returning from a cold, cool, crazy man to the original Akito. In the end, he personally thought that he became a character who would be protected like the heroine Leila.

For the English dub of the series, Akito was voiced by Micah Solusod.

Appperances

Code Geass: Akito the Exiled
Akito Hyuga is introduced as a young soldier fighting for the United Republic of Europia. Despite his stoic personality, Akito suffers a rage when fighting as his eyes flashes red lights and he keeps saying "kill". In the first episode, after Operation Marva, the young soldier Akito Hyuga remains as the single survivor using his skills as a mecha pilot, better known as Knightframe. He befriends Lieutenant Colonel Leila Malcal at a party and soon Leila becomes interested in knowing more about him. The two stop a terrorist attack perpetrated by trio of Japanese soldiers, who wanted to kidnap Europa United General Gene Smilas. In exchange for sparing their lives, Leila has terrorists Ryo Sayama, Ayano Kosaka and Yukiya Naruse join her Wyvern Squad. After quelling distrust with her new recruits, Leila leads the team in a mission with the E.U. Army to push back the invading Britannian army. Akito meets his brother Shin Hyuga Shaing who brainwashes to commit suicide through the Geass but he is stopped by Ryo. The group starts living with the Romani women who originally aimed to con them. During their stay, Akito and Leila bond upon telling each other's past. Akito and Shin were close halfbrothers Akito confessess that during his childhood, Shin used his Geass to order a toddler Akito to kill himself. However, because Akito had no clear understanding about what death was, he could not carry his order and started suffer mental damage. 

The Wyverns board the leading Ark Fleet ship and sink it. In the mission, Akito succumbs to Shin's Geass, and nearly kills Ashley. The Wyverns then appear, with Akito taking Leila from Shin. The remaining forces of the Knights of St. Michael assemble to launch a final assault on Castle Weisswolf against the W-0, along with their new ally Ashley. Although the Wyverns take down most of their forces, Shin remains superior. Leila then awakes her Geass which causes the late people to confront Shin. The fight continues as Akito's and Shin's Knightframes are damaged and start fighting with swords. As Shin is about to kill his brother, Jean intervenes and shoots him while being impaled by the man she loves. Shin drops his hatred and succumbs to his wounds next to Jean's body. The Wyvern Squad retires as Akito and Leila start a relationship.

Other appearances
Akito's design also appears in the video game Tales of Xillia 2. Merchandising based on him was also released. In 2016, a collaboration with a cafe using the images of Akito was made in Kobe. The character is also featured in the video game Code Geass: Genesic Re;Code. He is among those who have appeared in Fimbulwinter from different periods of time who agree to work together to restore the world.

Reception
In an "Overseas Popular Character Top 5" from the magazine Newtype, Akito took third place behind Hachiman Hikigaya from My Youth Romantic Comedy Is Wrong, As I Expected and Yuichiro Hyakuya from Seraph of the End. Fandom Post listed Akito as the 15th best character of Code Geass praising his fighting abilities and his relationship with the cast from the OVA. Masaki Endo from Mantan Web praised Akito's development due to how he opens up with Leila as both talk about their respective pasts. Comic Book Resources stated that several of Akito's actions subverts the darkest tropes from the television series, comparing Akito's order to kill his superior in the form of Geass with Lelouch's accidental order on Princess Euphemia; While Euphemia is forced to kill several of innocent Japanese people due to the Geass, Akito manages to overcome his brother Geass and stop himself from murdering Leila, giving the scene a romantic tone. The eventual ending of the series where the duo abandon the military, breaking the idea that the Geass would curse any of its users and that embodies the series' ideals of free will. Game Rant also noticed a major difference in the handling of Akito and Lelouch's fights and ideals due to how optimistic the former becomes thanks to Leila's aid and how after his final battle with Shin, the cast decides to live peacefully in contrast to how Lelouch decides to do dirty work in the world before his eventual arranged death.

ImpulseGamer feared that Akito might come across as a brooding archetype based on his quite personality which contrasts his insanity when fighting which he still enjoyed though. Anime News Network was more critical to the handling of Akito's personality due to how long it takes for his character to develop but still felt his battle enjoyable. Kotaku commented on the series' narrative positively, commenting on the philosophy that Akito suffers in regards to wanting to die which is rivaled by how Leila instead wants him to embrace the concept of living, an ideal that was briefly explored Lelouch of the Rebellion through Suzaku Kururugi's being ordered to live. Despite the character's nature and dark narrative, Sumikai enjoyed the Wyverns' rest as it helps to see a calmer side of themselves most notably the loner Akito or the rebellious Ashley. The Fandom Post agreed but still found the characters enjoyable as well as the handling of the pacing and how complex is Akito when seen properly. Besides Akito's past and how it is portrayed in the story, The Fandom Post found his growing relationship with Leila as one of the OVA's strongest point to the point Leila often feels as a more central character. Otaku USA felt the handling of Shin Hyuga to be entertaining for developing his brother but at the same time in a too simplistic way despite the franchise's fame for focusing on politics. Similarly, for the finale, Japaniac praised the fight between the two Hyuga brothers. Another relationship found appealing by the site was the one of Akito and Leila due to how they become connected by the power of Geass and develop a romantic bond. Although he found the ending appealing. Comic Book Resources found the duel between Akito and Shin tragic because of how the two make up before the latter's death.

References

Code Geass characters

Television characters introduced in 2012
Fictional attempted suicides
Fictional characters with post-traumatic stress disorder
Fictional child soldiers
Fictional Japanese people in anime and manga
Fictional special forces personnel
Fictional swordfighters in anime and manga
Male characters in anime and manga
Orphan characters in anime and manga
Teenage characters in anime and manga